Bedson may refer to:

 Derek Bedson (1920–1989), Canadian civil servant.
 Samuel Bedson (1886–1969), British microbiologist.
 Samuel Lawrence Bedson (1842–1891), British-born military man active in Canada.
 Bedson Ridge, a ridge in the Rocky Mountains located in Alberta, Canada. 
 Jack Bedson (born 1950), is an Australian writer.